Kurmitola Golf Club is a golf club in Dhaka Cantonment, Bangladesh. Operated by Bangladesh Army. The president of the club is the Chief of Army Staff Bangladesh Army General S M Shafiuddin Ahmed, OSP, ndu, psc The club has been described as "prestigious".

History
The club was formed in 1956. It was shifted to its present location in 1966. In 2016 the golf club was offered by the foreign ministry of Bangladesh to diplomats residing in the country; after outdoor activities by diplomats were cut over security fears. Siddikur Rahman a former caddy at the golf club become the first Bangladeshi in history to compete in golf at the Olympics in 2016. The club has held professional national and international golfing tournaments including the Asian Tour event Bashundhara Bangladesh Open.

References

Golf clubs and courses in Bangladesh
1956 establishments in East Pakistan
Clubs and societies in Bangladesh
Organisations based in Dhaka